Mihály Zoltán Sáfrán (born 21 March 1985 in Győr, Hungary) is a Hungarian ex-professional athlete in canoe sprint, fitness coach and health&fitness author. He is a two-times European champion of the 1000 metres race in C-2 and C-4 (2009, 2011), and a World Championship bronze medalist from 2011 in C-4 on the same distance. He has a 6th place from C-2 Canoe Marathon (2007) and C-4 1000m European Championship (2005), 5th place on WCh in C-2 1000m (2009). Two times national champion.

At age group events he has 2 gold medals from U23 European Championships in C-2 1000m (2007, 2008), 3 times bronze in C-2 500m (2007), C-2 1000m (2004), C-4 1000m (2006). He is a junior World Champion in C-1 1000m (2003), 2 times bronze medalist in C-4 1000m (2001) and C-4 500m (2003). 30 times national champion.

He also participated at the 2008 Summer Olympics in Beijing, finished at the semifinals of the C-2 500 m event.

He has a younger brother, Mátyás, who is also a sprint canoer and partners Mihály in the C-2 and C-4 boat as well.

After the elite sport career, he started writing books and articles about fitness, diet, cold adaptation, health, explained by quantum-biology science. He is also coaching people for general fitness and performance since 2014. His new sport hobby is the OCR (Obstacle Course Racing) and managed to win the 6km Bestial Race in Lanzarote (2022).

His hobbies are nature, camping, reading, guitar, SUP, windsurf, surfing, OCR competitions.

Studies
 Bioengineer (Budapest University of Technology and Economics, 2004–2010), chemical technician
 Sport coach (canoe-kayak, fitness-body building, MovNat Certified Trainer Level2, Spartan Bodyweight&Girja, Professional Training Programming)

Books
 A paleón túl (2014)
 Vad paleo (2016 with Elmira Mezei)
 Napfény diéta (2017)
 Legyél Te is biohacker! (2019 with Lakatos Péter)
 SunnyFitness (2019), English version
 Irodai Egyensúly Program (2019)
 SunnyFitness - Test karbantartás (2020), English: SunnyFitness - Body Maintenance
 SunnyFitness - Kőkondi (2022), English: SunnyFitness - Stone Gym
 SunnyFitness - OCR (2022)

References

External links
 Hungarian page: napfenydieta.hu 
 English page: mihalysafran.com 
 Blog about sport-nutrition-health, books, trainings, fitness camps, online&personal consultation
 YouTube channel
 Instagram: @mihalysafran

1985 births
Living people
Sportspeople from Székesfehérvár
Hungarian male canoeists
Olympic canoeists of Hungary
Canoeists at the 2008 Summer Olympics
ICF Canoe Sprint World Championships medalists in Canadian
21st-century Hungarian people